Milko Georgiev (born 3 August 1998) is a Bulgarian footballer who currently plays as a midfielder for Bansko.

Career

Botev Plovdiv 
Born in Vidin, Georgiev joined Botev Plovdiv at academy level in 2013. On 24 April 2016, he made his A Group debut in the local derby against Lokomotiv Plovdiv. 

On 16 June 2017, Georgiev signed his first professional contract with the club. In July 2017, he was loaned to Second League club Oborishte Panagyurishte but couldn't agree personal terms and in August moved to Chernomorets Balchik on loan.

On 21 April 2018 Milko Georgiev scored his first goal for Botev Plovdiv during the 2-4 defeat from Ludogorets Razgrad. After that he participated in the home wins over CSKA Sofia and Beroe Stara Zagora.

Career statistics

Club

Honours
Botev Plovdiv
Bulgarian Cup: 2016–17

References

External links
 

Living people
1998 births
People from Vidin
Bulgarian footballers
Bulgaria youth international footballers
Association football midfielders
Botev Plovdiv players
FC Chernomorets Balchik players
OFC Pirin Blagoevgrad players
FC CSKA 1948 Sofia players
First Professional Football League (Bulgaria) players